Ibycus is a genus of air-breathing semi-slugs, in the family Helicarionidae.

Species 
 Ibycus albacuminatus (P. Sarasin & F. Sarasin, 1899)
 Ibycus cingulatus (B.Rensch, 1930)
 Ibycus coriaceus (P. Sarasin & F. Sarasin, 1899)
 Ibycus fissidens Heynemann, 1863
 Ibycus hiraseanus (Pilsbry, 1906)
 Ibycus minutus (Godwin-Austen, 1876)
 Ibycus papuanus I. Rensch, 1932
 Ibycus perakensis (Godwin-Austen, 1909)
 Ibycus rachelae Schilthuizen & Liew, 2008
 Ibycus siamensis Cockerell, 1891

References 

 Bank, R. A. (2017). Classification of the Recent terrestrial Gastropoda of the World. Last update: July 16th, 2017

External links
 Sarasin, P. & Sarasin, F. (1899). Die Land-Mollusken von Celebes. Materialien zur Naturgeschichte der Insel Celebes. 2: 1-248, pls 1-31

Helicarionidae